Shark Sense is a U.S. Navy publication written for aviators on how to deal with sharks if they are forced to ditch a plane into the ocean.  It was published in 1944 by the Aviation Training Division in the Office of the Chief of Naval operations.

Content 
Shark Sense contains instructions for surviving in tropical waters. It discusses the likelihood of a shark attack and notes that science had little information on shark behavior.  The manual cautioned aviators not to rely on popular information about sharks .  

The manual also mentions that scientists were not sure if shark olfaction was the same as with humans.

Illustrations 
Shark Sense was created as a comic book in order to be entertaining while informative. The cover features an aviator scrambling in the water with a small fish nibbling on his toe. A thought bubble shows the aviator thinks a shark is attacking him.  He is having trouble keeping his head above water due to panic - staying calm is one of the points in the manual. 

Most of the illustrations are humorous, but the manual also contained illustrations of a more instructional nature. The instructional panels informed the aviators of body language when downed in tropical waters.

No artists or authors are explicitly credited within the manual.

References 

United States Navy publications